No. 1 Intelligence, Surveillance, and Reconnaissance Wing (1 ISR Wing) is a wing of the Royal Air Force and is part of the ISTAR Force in No. 1 Group based at RAF Waddington. 1 ISR Wing is responsible for producing intelligence from imagery intelligence and electronic surveillance.

History 
The wing was formed in 2016 merging several ISR units into a new speciality wing including the Tactical Imagery-Intelligence Wing, the signals intelligence and electronic intelligence No. 54 Signals Unit and imagery analysts from V (AC) Squadron. In 2018, the Reconnaissance, Intelligence and
Geographical Centre Northern Ireland (RIGC-NI) of 5 Regiment Army Air Corps was renamed No. 3 ISR Squadron and became part of 1 ISR Wing.

Structure 

The current structure of the wing is as follows:<ref name=

 No.1 Intelligence, Surveillance, and Reconnaissance Wing
 Wing Headquarters, at RAF Waddington
 No. 54 Signals Unit
 No. 1 Intelligence, Surveillance, and Reconnaissance Squadron
 No.2 Intelligence, Surveillance, and Reconnaissance Squadron
 No.3 Intelligence, Surveillance, and Reconnaissance Squadron, at Joint Helicopter Command Flying Station Aldergrove
 Intelligence, Surveillance, and Reconnaissance Support Squadron
 54 Signals Unit Engineering Flight, at RAF Waddington and RAF Digby (supporting 54 Signals Unit)
 ISR Engineering Squadron, at RAF Waddington and RAF Marham (supports No.2 ISR Squadron)

References 

Intelligence, Surveillance, and Reconnaissance 01
Military intelligence units and formations of the United Kingdom
Air force intelligence units and formations
Military units and formations established in 2016
1
2016 establishments in the United Kingdom